Franco Bassanini (born 9 May 1940, in Milan) is an Italian lawyer, politician, minister and undersecretary of state.

Career
Bassanini was a deputy from 1979 to 1996 and a senator from 1996 to 2006.

He served as the minister of public administration and regional affairs from 1996 to 2001 in the cabinets led by firstly Romano Prodi, then by Massimo D'Alema and lastly by Giuliano Amato.

He was also president of "Astrid", a think-tank specialising in the study of institutional and administrative reform.  As a member of the administrative council of the ENA, in 2007 he was called by Nicolas Sarkozy to take part in the  Commission pour la libération de la croissance française, presided over by Jacques Attali and designed to reform France's administration. He is a member of Italy-USA Foundation.

He also served as the professor of constitutional law at the First University of Rome and was the chairman of Cassa Depositi e Prestiti.

Also, he is on the advisory board of the Official and Financial Institutions Forum (OMFIF) where he is regularly involved in meetings regarding the financial and monetary system.

Honour 
 : Knight Grand Cross of the Order of Merit of the Italian Republic (13 january 2015)

References

1940 births
Living people
Politicians from Milan
Italian Socialist Party politicians
Independent Left (Italy) politicians
Democratic Party of the Left politicians
Democrats of the Left politicians
Democratic Party (Italy) politicians
Government ministers of Italy
Deputies of Legislature VIII of Italy
Deputies of Legislature IX of Italy
Deputies of Legislature X of Italy
Deputies of Legislature XI of Italy
Deputies of Legislature XII of Italy
Senators of Legislature XIII of Italy
Senators of Legislature XIV of Italy
Italian corporate directors
Academic staff of the Sapienza University of Rome
Lawyers from Milan
Knights Grand Cross of the Order of Merit of the Italian Republic